The House of the Free Press is a building in northern Bucharest, Romania, the tallest in the city between 1956 and 2007.

History
A horse race track was built in 1905 on the future site of the House of the Free Press. A third of the track was removed in 1950 to make way for a wing of the building, and the race track was finally closed and demolished in 1960, after a decision by Gheorghe Gheorghiu-Dej.

Construction began in 1952 and was completed in 1956. The building was named Combinatul Poligrafic Casa Scînteii "I.V.Stalin" and later Casa Scînteii (Scînteia was the name of the Romanian Communist Party's official newspaper).  It was designed by the architect Horia Maicu, in the Stalinist style of Socialist realism, resembling the main building of the Moscow State University, and was intended to house all of Bucharest's printing presses, the newsrooms and their staff.

Between 1952 and 1966, Casa Scînteii was featured on the reverse of the 100 lei banknote.

On 21 April 1960, a statue of Vladimir Lenin, made by Romanian sculptor Boris Caragea, was placed in front of the building. However, this statue was removed on 3 March 1990, following the Romanian Revolution of 1989. On 30 May 2016, the Monument of the Anti-Communist Fight ("Wings") was inaugurated in the same place.

Renamed  ("House of the Free Press"), the building has basically the same role nowadays, with many of today's newspapers having their headquarters in it. The Bucharest Stock Exchange (Bursa de Valori București, BVB) was located in the Southern wing at one point.

See also 
 Socialist realism in Romania
 Seven Sisters (Moscow)
 Palace of Culture and Science, Warsaw
 Latvian Academy of Sciences

References

External links

Skyscraper office buildings in Bucharest
Stalinist architecture
Socialist realism
Commercial buildings completed in 1956
Office buildings completed in 1956